Brachinus turkestanicus is a species of ground beetle in the Brachininae subfamily that is endemic to Uzbekistan.

References

Beetles described in 1928
Beetles of Asia
Brachininae